The 2019–20 Incarnate Word Cardinals women's basketball team represented the University of the Incarnate Word in the 2019-20 NCAA Division I women's basketball season. The Cardinals were led by coach Jeff Dow, in his first season, and are members of the Southland Conference. They finished the season 14–15, 10–10 in Southland play to finish in sixth place. Before they could play in the Southland women's tournament however, the tournament was cancelled due to the coronavirus pandemic.

Previous season
The Cardinals finished the season 5–24, 5–13 in Southland play to finish in a tie for tenth place. They failed to qualify for the Southland women's tournament.

On March 10, Christy Smith's contract was not renewed. She finished with a 3-year record of 21–68.

Roster
Sources:

Schedule
Sources:

|-
!colspan=8 style=|Non-conference regular season
|-

|-
!colspan=8 style=|Southland regular season
|-

|-
!colspan=8 style=|Non-conference regular season
|-

|-
!colspan=8 style=|Southland regular season
|-

|-
!colspan=8 style=| 2020 Hercules Tires Southland Basketball Tournament

See also
2019–20 Incarnate Word Cardinals men's basketball team

References

Incarnate Word
Incarnate Word Cardinals women's basketball seasons
Incarnate Word
Incarnate Word